The Canton of Le Diamant is a former canton in the Arrondissement of Le Marin on Martinique. It had 5,983 inhabitants (2012). It was disbanded in 2015. The canton comprised the commune of Le Diamant.

References

Cantons of Martinique